Henry Elliot was a British diplomat.

Henry Elliot is also the name of:

 Henry Miers Elliot (1808–1853), Indian civil servant and historian
 Henry George Elliot (1826–1907), Canadian-born soldier and administrator

See also

Henry Elliott (disambiguation)
Henry Eliot (disambiguation)
Harry Elliot (1920–2009)